Artur Pătraș (born 1 October 1988) is a Moldovan footballer who plays as a midfielder for Zimbru Chișinău in the Moldovan National Division.

Club career
In March 2007, he made his debut in the Romanian Liga I in a match against Dinamo București.

Pătraș joined Azerbaijan Premier League club AZAL in the summer of 2012, but in December he cancelled the contract.

International career
Pătraș played 29 matches for the Moldova national team from 2011 to 2020. He made his international debut in a friendly match against Poland on 6 February 2011.

Honours
Milsami Orhei
Moldovan National Division: 2014–15
Moldovan Super Cup: 2019
Sheriff Tiraspol
Moldovan National Division: 2015–16

References

External links
 
 
 

1988 births
Living people
Moldovan footballers
Moldova international footballers
Association football midfielders
Footballers from Chișinău
FC Gloria Buzău players
FC Politehnica Timișoara players
LPS HD Clinceni players
ASC Oțelul Galați players
CS Concordia Chiajna players
AZAL PFK players
FC Milsami Orhei players
FC Sheriff Tiraspol players
CS Petrocub Hîncești players
FC Sfîntul Gheorghe players
FC Zimbru Chișinău players
Speranța Nisporeni players
Liga I players
Liga II players
Moldovan Super Liga players
Azerbaijan Premier League players
Moldovan expatriate footballers
Expatriate footballers in Romania
Moldovan expatriate sportspeople in Romania
Expatriate footballers in Azerbaijan
Moldovan expatriate sportspeople in Azerbaijan